Garcia House may refer to:

Domingo Yorba Adobe and Casa Manuel Garcia, San Juan Capistrano, California, listed on the NRHP in Orange County, California
Garcia House (Los Angeles, California), also known as "Rainbow", designed by architect John Lautner
Tomasa Griego De Garcia House, Albuquerque, New Mexico, listed on the NRHP in Bernalillo County, New Mexico
Garcia House (Mora, New Mexico), listed on the NRHP in Mora County
Garcia Opera House, Socorro, New Mexico, listed on the NRHP in Socorro County
Juan Antonio Garcia House, Albuquerque, New Mexico, listed on the NRHP in Bernalillo County
Juan Nepomuceno Garcia House, Socorro, New Mexico, listed on the NRHP in Socorro County
Juan Garcia House, La Luz, New Mexico, listed on the NRHP in Otero County
Garcia-Garza House, San Antonio, Texas, listed on the NRHP in Bexar County, Texas